Schulhofer is a surname. Notable people with the surname include:
Flint S. Schulhofer (1926–2006), American racehorse trainer
Stephen Schulhofer (born 1942), American legal academic